The Columbus Firefighters Memorial, or Firefighters' Memorial, is a monument commemorating firefighters who died while serving by Ed Nothaker, installed in Columbus, Ohio's Battelle Riverfront Park, in the United States. It was erected in 1958 and features an eternal flame on top of Greek columns.

The memorial was dedicated on April 13, 1958, and rededicated on October 16, 1988. It was surveyed by the Smithsonian Institution's "Save Outdoor Sculpture!" program in 1993.

See also

 1958 in art
 Ohio Police and Fire Memorial Park

References

External links
 
 

1958 establishments in Ohio
1958 sculptures
Downtown Columbus, Ohio
Monuments and memorials in Ohio
Outdoor sculptures in Columbus, Ohio